Bullets or Ballots is a 1936 American gangster film starring Edward G. Robinson, Joan Blondell, Barton MacLane, and Humphrey Bogart. Robinson plays a police detective who infiltrates a crime gang. This is the first of several films featuring both Robinson and Bogart.

Robinson's character, Johnny Blake, was based on Johnny Broderick, a New York City detective.

Plot
Detective Johnny Blake is a New York City cop who has made his reputation by cracking down on racketeers. When Blake gets kicked off the force, a powerful crime boss named Al Kruger hires him in an attempt to gain fresh ideas about sidestepping the law and expanding his criminal empire. Masterminding the mob are three very powerful bankers, who are only known by the crime boss. Blake soon gains Kruger's trust and rises through the ranks of the criminal organization, much to the distaste of Bugs Fenner, who believes Blake to be a police informer.

To compensate for a reduction in the mob's revenue, Blake suggests to Kruger that they go into the numbers racket, currently run on a small scale by Blake's girlfriend, Lee Morgan. Kruger follows Blake's proposal, and the mob's money flow is so great that Kruger ignores the other rackets. In reality, Blake is cooperating with Captain Dan McLaren in order to find the leaders of the crime ring. With Blake's information, the police engage in a series of raids on the crime syndicate's operations. Fenner, unhappy with the focus of the rackets, kills Kruger in an attempt to take over as the head of the mob. But Blake has already been granted the title as boss by the leaders, and he takes over control, meeting up with the three bankers.

When Fenner's produce racket gets raided by the police and Blake is seen as the fingerman by a spotter, Fenner attempts to kill Blake, while he waits to deliver money to the bankers. During a gun battle, Fenner is killed and Blake is mortally wounded. He is able to arrive at the bank, leading McLaren to the bankers, who are subsequently arrested.

Cast

 Edward G. Robinson as Detective Johnny Blake
 Joan Blondell as Lee Morgan
 Barton MacLane as Al Kruger
 Humphrey Bogart as Nick "Bugs" Fenner
 Frank McHugh as Herman McCloskey
 Joe King as Captain Dan "Mac" McLaren (credited as Joseph King)
 Dick Purcell as Ed Driscoll (credited as Richard Purcell)
 George E. Stone as Wires Kagel
 Joseph Crehan as Grand Jury Spokesman
 Henry O'Neill as Ward Bryant
 Henry Kolker as Mr. Hollister
 Gilbert Emery as Mr. Thorndyke
 Herbert Rawlinson as Mr. Caldwell
 Louise Beavers as Nellie LaFleur
 Norman Willis as Louie Vinci
Uncredited
 William Pawley as Crail
 Ralph Remley as Kelly
 Frank Faylen as Gatley - pinball racketeer
 Garry Owen as The Spotter

Production

Edward G. Robinson and Humphrey Bogart went on to make four more films together: Kid Galahad (1937) with Bette Davis, The Amazing Dr. Clitterhouse (1938), Brother Orchid (1940) and Key Largo (1948) with Lauren Bacall, Claire Trevor and Lionel Barrymore.

Reception
Writing for The Spectator in 1936, Graham Greene described the film as "a good gangster film of the second class", and praising actor Robinson as having given "a reliable performance".

Adaptations to other media
Bullets or Ballots was adapted as a one-hour radio play on the April 17, 1939, broadcast of Lux Radio Theater with Edward G. Robinson, Mary Astor, and Humphrey Bogart.

References

External links
 
 
 
 

1936 films
1936 crime drama films
American crime drama films
American black-and-white films
1930s English-language films
American gangster films
Films about organized crime in the United States
Films set in New York City
First National Pictures films
Warner Bros. films
Films directed by William Keighley
1930s American films
Films scored by Bernhard Kaun